The West Fork Trail of Oak Creek Canyon has been called one of the best trails in Coconino National Forest and one of the top ten trails in the United States.

References

Trails